Phasianema is a genus of sea snails, marine gastropod mollusks in the family Pyramidellidae, the pyrams and their allies.

Species
Species within the genus Phasianema include:
 Phasianema costatum Brocchi
 Phasianema phycophyllum Golikov & Kussakin in Golikov & Scarlato, 1967

References

External links
 To World Register of Marine Species

Pyramidellidae
Monotypic gastropod genera